George Cotes (or Cotys, Coates) (died 1556) was an English academic and Catholic Bishop of Chester during the English Reformation.

He had been a Fellow of Balliol College, Oxford in 1522, and then became a Fellow of Magdalen College, Oxford in 1527. He was Junior Proctor of Oxford University in 1531. It was some years before he was elected Master of Balliol College, in which post he served in the years 1539–1545.

With the accession of Queen Mary, he was chosen to succeed the former Carmelite John Bird, who had been deprived because he was married, as Bishop of Chester. Cotes was consecrated on 1 April 1554 by bishops Stephen Gardiner of Winchester, Edmund Bonner of London, and Cuthbert Tunstall of  Durham, and received papal provision on 6 July 1554. However, he held the post for only a short period of time before he died in c. January 1556.

During the Marian Persecutions he had Protestant George Marsh burnt at the stake as a heretic.

Notes

References
F. Sanders, 'George Cotes, Master of Balliol and Bishop of Chester',  in Notes and Queries 1894 series 8-V (1894) 48–49.
F. Huskisson & E. Marshall, 'George Cotes, Master of Balliol and Bishop of Chester', in Notes and Queries series 8-V (1894) 153.

1556 deaths
16th-century English Roman Catholic bishops
Bishops of Chester
Fellows of Balliol College, Oxford
Fellows of Magdalen College, Oxford
Year of birth unknown
Masters of Balliol College, Oxford